The Museo Mille Miglia is an automobile museum founded on 10 November 2004 at the initiative of the Automobile Club of Brescia and of some private enthusiasts of the famous Mille Miglia race.
It is located in the ancient monastery of St. Euphemia in Via delle Rimembranze in Brescia, and more precisely on the outside of the neighborhood is Saint Euphemia.

The route is divided into nine sections of time, seven dedicated to the Mille Miglia races from 1927 to 1957, one at Mille Miglia from 1958 to 1961 and one at the Mille Miglia contemporanea, and in each of these sections there are historic cars , periodically replaced to allow their participation in various historic car racing, including Mille Miglia.

See also
Alfa Romeo Museum 
Museo Casa Enzo Ferrari 
Museo Ferrari 
Museo Nazionale dell'Automobile 
Museo Lamborghini
Museo Vincenzo Lancia
List of automobile museums

References 

Museums in Brescia
Automobile museums in Italy